Scaptius is a genus of moths in the family Erebidae erected by Francis Walker in 1855.

Species
 Scaptius asteroides Schaus, 1905
 Scaptius cerdai Toulgoët, 1994
 Scaptius chrysopera Schaus, 1905
 Scaptius chrysoperina Gaede, 1928
 Scaptius ditissima Walker, 1855
 Scaptius holophaea (Hampson, 1905)
 Scaptius ignivena Joicey & Talbot, 1917
 Scaptius neritosia E. D. Jones, 1908
 Scaptius obscurata Schaus, 1920
 Scaptius prumaloides Rothschild, 1909
 Scaptius pseudoprumala Rothschild, 1935
 Scaptius sordida Rothschild, 1909
 Scaptius submarginalis Rothschild, 1909
 Scaptius vinasia Schaus, 1910

Former species
 Scaptius sanguistrigata (Dognin, 1910)

References

Phaegopterina
Moth genera